Le Monde de la musique was a French monthly musical magazine published from 1978 to 2009 with a circulation of 20,000 copies in 2008.

The design of the project - dealing with all music and not just "classical" music - was developed in partnership with Télérama, with Francis Mayor as Managing Editor, with the support of an editorial board including journalists from both parent publications. The first editors of the magazine were Louis Dandrel and Anne Rey. Le Monde de la musique was then published by various companies. Its chief editorship was assured by personalities such as Anne Rey, Jacques Drillon, François Pigeaud, Alain Lompech,  and Nathalie Krafft.

In 2009, the magazine disappeared and its readership was transferred to Classica.

It ranked records according to a star system, with four stars being the highest rating. Some selected records received the CHOC symbol.

References

External links 
 Le Monde de la Musique (consultation of the complete collection from N°1 of 1978) on the site of the 

Classical music magazines
Defunct magazines published in France
French-language magazines
Magazines established in 1978
Magazines disestablished in 2009
Magazines published in Paris
Music magazines published in France